The Wudu River, also known as Suoqiao River, Luoxi River, Shangzhai River, Ban River and Gesuo River, is a tributary of the Beipan River in Panzhou, Guizhou, China.

References

Rivers of Guizhou
Tributaries of the Pearl River (China)